Saint Lucy Parish may refer to:
The Parish of Saint Lucy, Barbados
Saint Lucy Parish, Campbell, California

Parish name disambiguation pages